The Affair is a 1995 American romantic drama television film directed by Paul Seed and starring Courtney B. Vance as an African-American soldier in the United States Army who is deployed to England during World War II and has an affair with a British officer's wife, played by Kerry Fox.

Cast
 Courtney B. Vance as Travis Holloway
 Kerry Fox as Maggie Leyland
 Ciarán Hinds as Edward Leyland
 Leland Gantt as Barrett
 Ned Beatty as Col. Banning
 Bill Nunn as Sgt. Rivers
 Beatie Edney as Esther
 Fraser James as Sonny
 Adrian Lester as Ray
 Rory Jennings as David Leyland
 Nicholas Selby as Mr. Leyland
Anna Cropper as Mrs. Leyland
 Rolf Saxon as Capt. Marks
 Todd Boyce as Capt. Carlson

Production
Many extras from the film were American Soldiers stationed at RAF Lakenheath and RAF Mildenhall, including AFJROTC from Lakenheath AHS.

References

External links
 

1995 television films
1995 films
1995 romantic drama films
American romantic drama films
1990s English-language films
Films about adultery in the United States
African-American films
War romance films
Films set in the 1940s
Films about interracial romance
Films about capital punishment
World War II films based on actual events
HBO Films films
1990s American films